Results from Norwegian football in 1930. See also 1929 in Norwegian football and 1931 in Norwegian football

Østlandsligaen 1929/30 (Unofficial)
The league discontinued in 1930/31, but re-appeared one final time in 1931/32.

Hovedserien

Promoted: Birkebeineren, Lyn, Tistedalen.

Class A of local association leagues
Class A of local association leagues (kretsserier) is the predecessor of a national league competition.

Norwegian Cup

Final

Northern Norwegian Cup

Final

National team

Sources:

References

    
Seasons in Norwegian football